Kevin Lee Morgan (born December 3, 1969) is a former Major League Baseball player and current Minnesota Twins executive. In , he had one at bat for the New York Mets, pitching hitting for Barry Manuel and popping out on the first pitch he saw in the Major Leagues; he finished the game by playing two innings in the field at third base.

He formerly served as the Mets' Director of Minor League Operations.

A native of Lafayette, Louisiana, Morgan attended Southeastern Louisiana University and in 1989 he played collegiate summer baseball with the Chatham A's of the Cape Cod Baseball League. He was selected by Detroit Tigers in the 30th round of the 1991 MLB Draft. He was traded by the Tigers to the Mets in 1994, and appeared in a single major league game for the Mets in 1997.

References

Sources

Major League Baseball third basemen
New York Mets players
Niagara Falls Rapids players
Fayetteville Generals players
Lakeland Tigers players
St. Lucie Mets players
Binghamton Mets players
Norfolk Tides players
Baseball players from Louisiana
New York Mets executives
1969 births
Living people
Southeastern Louisiana Lions baseball players
Chatham Anglers players
American expatriate baseball players in Australia
African-American baseball players
Minnesota Twins executives